Edward Willliam Ellis Irving (2 January 1902 – 27 March 1983) was an Australian film actor who appeared in a number of British films. He was married to the British stage and screen actress Sophie Stewart.

He was born Sydney, Australia in January 1902 and died in March 1983 in Cupar, Scotland. he appeared in productions from 1932 and 1968.

Filmography

References

External links

1902 births
1983 deaths
Australian male film actors
20th-century Australian male actors